Samuel Babcock Booth (October 29, 1883June 17, 1935) was fourth bishop of the Episcopal Diocese of Vermont.

Biography
He was born in Philadelphia to Henry Driver Booth and Mary Bourne Babcock Booth. Booth attended the William Penn Charter School and graduated from Harvard College in 1906 and the Virginia Theological Seminary in 1911. He was ordained deacon in June 1910 and priest in 1911, serving as a missionary in Idaho from 1910 to 1914. He was rector of St. Luke's Church, Kensington, Philadelphia (1914-1918), chaplain to an American Red Cross evacuation hospital in France, and superintendent of missions, Bucks County, Pennsylvania, before consecration as bishop coadjutor of Vermont on February 17, 1925. He succeeded Arthur C. A. Hall as diocesan bishop on February 26, 1930.

Booth married Anna Peck on September 6, 1910. Together, they had seven children.

Personal and family Life
He was baptized at St. Timothy's Church, Roxborough, on 24 Feb 1884.

He married Anna Peck on 5 September 1910 at St. John's, Georgetown, Washington, D.C. He and Anna had seven children:
Robert, born 3 August 1912
Katherine, born 17 February 1916
Mary Ann, born 21 December 1917 in Philadelphia and died 8 February 1918 in Philadelphia
Ellen Bourne, born 2 April 1919
Anne Curtis, born 18 May 1922 in Wrightstown, Bucks, PA and died 03 Nov 2020 in Newcastle, Lincoln, ME 
Madeline Tasker Polk, born 6 October 1924
Samuel Babcock, born 17 March 1928 in Burlington, VT

References
 Obituary in The Living Church, June 22, 1935, p. 784.

1883 births
1935 deaths
Clergy from Philadelphia
Harvard College alumni
Episcopal bishops of Vermont
William Penn Charter School alumni
20th-century American Episcopalians